Kremin is a Ukrainian-language surname literally meaning "flint".

Kremin may also refer to:
FC Kremin Kremenchuk, a football club in Kremenchuk, Ukraine
Kremin Stadium, Kremenchuk, Ukraine

See also

Kremen (disambiguation)